Saint Jerome in His Study is a c. 1445–1446 painting by Colantonio, a painter active in Naples between 1440 and around 1470. It shows the strong influence of contemporary Flemish and French art on the painter and originally formed part of a multi-panel altarpiece for the church of San Lorenzo Maggiore, later split up.

The work is now in the National Museum of Capodimonte.

Sources 
 Pierluigi De Vecchi ed Elda Cerchiari, I tempi dell'arte, volume 2, Bompiani, Milano 1999. 
 Stefano Zuffi, Il Quattrocento, Electa, Milano 2004.

External links 
 http://museodicapodimonte.campaniabeniculturali.it/itinerari-tematici/galleria-di-immagini/OA900232 

Colantonio
1446 paintings
Paintings in the collection of the Museo di Capodimonte
Books in art
Lions in art
Altarpieces